Hans Hach Verdugo (born 11 November 1989) is a Mexican tennis player.

Hach Verdugo has a career high ATP doubles ranking of World No. 60 achieved on 11 July 2022. He has a career high singles ranking of World No. 528 achieved on 20 July 2015. Hach Verdugo has won one ATP doubles title, one ITF singles title, three Challenger and 19 ITF doubles titles.

Hach Verdugo has represented Mexico at the Davis Cup where he has a W/L record of 3–1.

College career
Hach Verdugo played college tennis at Abilene Christian University.

Professional career
In July 2021 he won his maiden ATP doubles title at the 2021 Los Cabos Open partnering John Isner as wildcards.

Personal information 
He has been sponsored since 2014 by premium activewear brand, Loriet Sports.

ATP career finals

Doubles: 1 (1 title)

Challenger and Futures finals

Singles: 1 (1–0)

Doubles: 46 (25–21)

References

External links
 
 
 

1989 births
Living people
Mexican male tennis players
Sportspeople from Culiacán
Tennis players from Dallas
Tennis players at the 2015 Pan American Games
Pan American Games competitors for Mexico
21st-century Mexican people